Voyn Yordanov Voynov (born 7 September 1952) is a former Bulgarian footballer who played as a winger. 

Voynov started playing in 1972 and spent the whole of his career as a player in Levski Sofia until 1981. He played 226 games and scored 36 goals in A PFG all for Levski. He played a quarter final for the UEFA Cup in 1976 and for the Cup Winners' Cup in 1977. He played for the Bulgarian national team in 32 games and took part in World Cup tournament in 1974 with it. Voinov was known as a fast and technical player. 

He coached FC Iskar, Hebar Pazardzhik, Belasitsa Petrich, Rodopa Smolyan, Slivnishki geroi, Minyor Pernik, Akademik Sofia, Lokomotiv Mezdra, Bansko, Lyubimets, Rilski Sportist and currently Lokomotiv Plovdiv.

Awards

 Bulgarian champion with Levski: 1973-1974, 1976–1977, 1978–1979

 Bulgarian Cup winner with Levski: 1975-1976, 1976–1977, 1978–1979

 1973–76 Balkan Cup winner with Bulgaria

See also

 List of one-club men in association football

References

External links
Profile at levskisofia.info

1952 births
Living people
Bulgarian footballers
Bulgaria international footballers
1974 FIFA World Cup players
PFC Levski Sofia players
First Professional Football League (Bulgaria) players
Bulgarian football managers
PFC Lokomotiv Plovdiv managers
PFC Hebar Pazardzhik managers
Association football forwards
People from Sofia City Province